Vice Admiral Bertram Chalmers Watson CB DSO (20 March 1887 – 22 July 1976) was a Royal Navy officer who became Rear Admiral, Submarines.

Naval career
Watson served in the First World War and, after being promoted to captain on 31 December 1925, he became commanding officer of the cruiser HMS Curlew in July 1932 and of the battleship HMS Valiant in August 1933. He went on to become Rear Admiral, Submarines in December 1938 and, after seeing action in that role in the early stages of the Second World War, went on to be Flag Officer Greenock in January 1940 and Flag Officer Commanding, Iceland in October 1943.

References

1887 births
1976 deaths
Royal Navy admirals
Companions of the Order of the Bath
Companions of the Distinguished Service Order